Arthur Christmas is a 2011 computer-animated Christmas science fantasy comedy film co-produced by Sony Pictures Animation and Aardman Animations. The film is Aardman's second entirely computer-animated feature film after 2006's Flushed Away. It was directed by Sarah Smith (in her feature directorial debut), co-directed by Barry Cook, and written by Smith and Peter Baynham. Featuring the voices of James McAvoy, Hugh Laurie, Bill Nighy, Jim Broadbent, Imelda Staunton, and Ashley Jensen, the film is set on Christmas Eve, and centres on Arthur Claus, the clumsy but well-meaning son of Santa Claus, who discovers that his father's high-tech ship has failed to deliver one girl's present. Accompanied only by his free-spirited and reckless grandfather, an enthusiastic young Christmas elf obsessed with wrapping gifts for children, and a team of reindeer, he embarks on a mission to deliver the girl's present personally.

Following the underperformance of Flushed Away, DreamWorks Animation did not renew its partnership with Aardman. In April 2007, Aardman signed a three-year deal with Sony. Originally titled Operation Rudolph, the project was first announced in 2007. Aardman spent 18 months on pre-production on the story and design in the UK before relocating to Sony's Culver City, US, for another 18 months of production. On 27 April 2009, it was reported that production had begun with Aardman and Sony Pictures Imageworks working together on animation.

Arthur Christmas was released on November 11, 2011 in the United Kingdom, and on November 23, 2011 in the United States, by Sony Pictures Releasing through its Columbia Pictures label. The film received positive reviews from critics. The film earned $147 million at the box office.

Plot
Instead of a single individual, Santa Claus is a hereditary title belonging to gift-givers that has been carried on for many generations. The current Santa, Malcolm Claus, is heading his seventieth mission, but his role has largely been reduced to that of a figurehead. The traditional sleigh and reindeer have been replaced by the S-1, a high-tech vessel operated by hundreds of elves that use advanced equipment and military precision to deliver presents. The complex Christmas operations are micromanaged from a North Pole-based Mission Control by Malcolm's eldest son, Steve, who expects to be handed down the role of Santa following his father’s retirement. Meanwhile, Malcolm's younger son, Arthur, answers letters sent from children to Santa.

During one of the delivery operations in Poland, a toy is accidentally activated, waking a child and nearly revealing Santa. A tense escape operation ensues, during which an elf aboard the S-1 leans on a button, causing a present to fall from the supply line and go unnoticed. Another elf named Bryony Shelfley later finds the missed present—a wrapped bicycle for a young girl named Gwen living in Trelew, Cornwall, whose letter Arthur had personally responded to. Arthur is heartbroken to hear a child’s been missed and urges his father and brother to use the S-1 and deliver the final present but Steve argues that one missed present out of billions is an acceptable error, citing this year's Christmas as the most successful in history. Malcolm's cynical elderly father and predecessor, Grandsanta, whisks Arthur away to deliver it in EVE, the original wooden sleigh that is pulled by the descendants of the flying reindeer. Bryony is revealed to have stowed away and joins the pair, but they get lost on three different continents, lose several of their reindeer and encounter many obstacles, ultimately being mistaken for aliens and causing an international military incident.

Arthur is shocked and hurt to learn that Grandsanta only agreed to go on the trip to boost his own ego, Malcolm is indifferent to the missing present, and Steve refuses to help them because he believes Arthur's efforts could undermine his attempts to become the next Santa.

Finally, stranded on an island in Cuba, Arthur becomes disillusioned with his family and nearly gives up. However, he realizes that so long as the gift is delivered one way or another, the "Santa" Arthur and Gwen look up to exists in the hearts of children. Reinvigorated, Arthur manages to get the sleigh back and the trio sets off for England. Meanwhile, the elves grow increasingly alarmed at rumors of the neglected delivery and the Clauses' indifference, sending them into a panic. In response, Malcolm tricks his wife Margaret into believing Steve gave them permission to use the S-1 to deliver Gwen’s gift, only for a furious Steve to confront his father onboard and a dejected Malcolm recognises his inability to properly lead. Steve drives the S-1 and delivers a superior present, only to realise that Malcolm had accidentally set the address to the wrong child, revealing Steve’s inability to connect with children.

Arthur’s group reach England but lose the remaining reindeer. Furthermore, a Predator drone scrambled by Chief De Silva of UNFITA intercepts and opens fire on the sleigh, believing it to be an alien spacecraft. Grandsanta sacrifices EVE, while Arthur and Bryony parachute to the ground.

All paths descend on Gwen’s house before she awakens, only to have everyone but Arthur quarrel about who gets to actually place the gift. Noticing that Arthur was the only one who genuinely cared about Gwen’s happiness, the elder Clauses collectively realize that he is the sole worthy successor. As a result, Steve recognises his own shortcomings, forfeits his birthright and acknowledges his brother's worthiness to take up the mantle, with Malcolm admitting he’s truly proud of both his sons. Gwen glimpses a snow-bearded Arthur in a wind-buffeted sweater just before he vanishes up into the S-1.

In a postscript, Malcolm goes into a happy retirement with Margaret - where he also becomes Grandsanta's much-desired new companion - and plays Arthur's board game with him for many happy hours. Meanwhile, Steve finds true contentment as the chief operating officer of the North Pole. Bryony is promoted to Vice-President of Wrapping, Pacific Division. The high-tech S-1 is rechristened EVIE in honor of Grandsanta's old sleigh and refitted to be pulled by a team of five thousand reindeer led by the original eight, all of whom have returned home safely. And at the helm, Arthur happily guides the entire enterprise as Santa Claus XXI.

Voice cast
James McAvoy as Arthur Claus, the clumsy but good-natured younger son of Malcolm and Margaret who works in the mail room. 
Hugh Laurie as Steven Claus, Malcolm and Margaret's elder son and Arthur's incredibly capable, business oriented, but cynical, older brother.
Bill Nighy as Grandsanta, the 136-year-old free-spirited and reckless grandfather of Steve and Arthur, a staunchly traditional former Santa who dislikes the modern world. A post-retirement joyriding incident which led to the Cuban Missile Crisis caused the Claus family to ban him from flying. He comes out of retirement to help Arthur save Christmas, though his unfamiliarity with the modern world leads them into trouble. He was Malcolm's predecessor and the 19th Santa, serving from 1902 to 1941.
Jim Broadbent as Malcolm Claus, the affable but ineffective man in charge at the North Pole. He is Grandsanta's son, Margaret's husband, and Steve's and Arthur's father. He has held the title of Santa since 1941 and is the 20th to serve in that role.
Imelda Staunton as Margaret Claus, Malcolm's dedicated and talented wife, and mother of Steve and Arthur.
Ashley Jensen as Bryony Shelfley, Wrapping Division Grade 3, the Scottish-accented enthusiastic Christmas Elf from the Giftwrap Battalion who ends up tagging along with Arthur and Grandsanta.
Marc Wootton as Peter, Steve's obsequious assistant Christmas Elf.
Laura Linney as North Pole Computer
Eva Longoria as Chief De Silva, the head of UNFITA (United Northern Federal International Treaty Alliance).
Ramona Marquez as Gwen Hines, the girl who lives in a Cornish village of Trelew with her mom and stepfather and whose present Arthur must deliver.
Michael Palin as Ernie Clicker, the elderly elf and former head of Polar communications for 46 missions during Grand-Santa's time as Santa Claus. He is brought out of retirement to help Steven track Grandsanta's old-fashioned sleigh.
Jerry Lambert as N.O.R.A.D.
Ryan Patrick Donahoe as Pedro
Lead elves are voiced by Sanjeev Bhaskar, Robbie Coltrane, Joan Cusack, Rhys Darby, Jane Horrocks, Iain McKee, Andy Serkis, and Dominic West.

Elves are voiced by Pete Jack, Sarah Smith, Rich Fulcher, Kris Pearn, Kevin Cecil, Stewart Lee, Peter Baynham, Danny John-Jules, Adam Tandy, Bronagh Gallagher, Alan Short, Kevin Eldon, Seamus Malone, Cody Cameron and Emma Kennedy.

Production
Arthur Christmas was first announced in 2007, under the name Operation Rudolph. It was the first film made by Aardman in partnership with Sony Pictures Entertainment and its subsidiaries, after they parted ways with DreamWorks Animation.

Aardman spent 18 months on pre-production on the story and design in the UK before relocating to Sony's Culver City, US, for another 18 months of production. On 27 April 2009, it was reported that production had begun with Aardman and Sony Pictures Imageworks working together on animation.

Release
The film was released on 11 November 2011 in the United Kingdom and on 23 November 2011 in the United States. The music video for Justin Bieber's song Santa Claus is Coming to Town, which plays over the end credits, was exclusively shown in theatres before the film.

Home media
Arthur Christmas was released on DVD, Blu-ray and Blu-ray 3D on 6 November 2012, in the US, and 19 November 2012 in the UK.

Reception

Critical response
The consensus reads, "Aardman Animations broadens their humor a bit for Arthur Christmas, a clever and earnest holiday film with surprising emotional strength." On Metacritic, the film has a score of 69 out of 100 based on 32 reviews, indicating "generally favorable reviews". Audiences polled by CinemaScore gave the film an average grade of "A-" on an A+ to F scale.

John Anderson of Newsday praised the film as "not only funny and fresh, but . . . a new way of tackling the whole yuletide paradigm: Santa as a high-tech hereditary monarchy." Michael O'Sullivan of The Washington Post described it as "unexpectedly fresh, despite the familiar-sounding premise". Neil Genzlinger of The New York Times wrote that "the plot may be a little too cluttered for the toddler crowd to follow, but the next age group up should be amused, and the script by Peter Baynham and Sarah Smith has plenty of sly jokes for grown-ups." Rene Rodriguez of the Miami Herald stated that "the movie fails utterly at coming up with a story that merits all the eye candy."

Box office
Arthur Christmas has earned $46,462,469 in North America, $33,334,089 in the UK, and $67,622,914 in other countries, for a worldwide total of $147,419,472.

In the United Kingdom the film opened in second place with a £2.5 million weekend gross, behind Immortals. It topped the box office in its fourth week, by which time the cumulative gross was £11.5 million. The film returned to the top of the box office on week seven, during Christmas week, grossing £2.05 million and a total of £19.7 million.

In the United States and Canada the film earned $2.4 million on its opening day and $1.8 million on Thanksgiving Day. It would go on to gross $12.1 million over the three-day weekend and $16.3 million over the five-day period. This was on par with studio expectations. The film went on to gross nearly $50 million domestically against a $100 million budget.

Accolades

Music

Arthur Christmas: Original Motion Picture Soundtrack is the soundtrack to the film of the same name. It was composed and produced by Harry Gregson-Williams, who had previously worked with Aardman on Chicken Run (2000) and Flushed Away (2006), and released on 14 November 2011 by Sony Classical. Originally, Michael Giacchino and Adam Cohen were going to compose the score.

Track listing

Video game
An iOS video game titled Arthur Christmas: Elf Run was released in the United Kingdom on 9 November 2011, on iTunes App Store. On 18 November 2011, the game was released worldwide on the iOS and Android platform. Released as a free and a premium version, the game allows players to play as delivery elves, who must quickly and quietly deliver gifts to children. Another iOS app based on the film is Arthur Christmas Movie Storybook, which was released on 30 November 2011.

See also
 List of Christmas films
 Santa Claus in film

References

External links

2011 films
2011 3D films
2011 animated films
2011 computer-animated films
2010s American animated films
2010s Christmas films
2010s Christmas comedy-drama films
2010s fantasy comedy-drama films
Aardman Animations films
American children's animated comedy films
American children's animated fantasy films
American Christmas comedy-drama films
American computer-animated films
American fantasy comedy-drama films
Animated Christmas films
British children's animated films
British children's comedy films
British children's fantasy films
British Christmas comedy-drama films
British computer-animated films
2010s children's fantasy films
Columbia Pictures animated films
Columbia Pictures films
Films about security and surveillance
Films about technology
Films directed by Barry Cook
Films produced by Peter Lord
Films scored by Harry Gregson-Williams
Films set in Africa
Films set in the Arctic
Films set in the Atlantic Ocean
Films set in Brussels
Films set in Cuba
Films set in Cornwall
Films set in Denmark
Animated films set in France
Films set in Germany
Films set in Idaho
Films set in Mexico
Films set in Spain
Films set in Toronto
Films set in Washington, D.C.
Films set in the White House
Santa Claus in film
Films with screenplays by Peter Baynham
Sony Pictures Animation films
3D animated films
Annie Award winners
2010s English-language films
2010s British films
Animated films about brothers
Films about father–son relationships